Bour is a surname. Notable people with the surname include:

Edmond Bour (1832–1866), French engineer
Ernest Bour (1913–2001), French conductor
Elliot M. Bour (born 1969), American director, animator, and actor
Igor Bour (born 1984), Moldavian weightlifter
Justin Bour (born 1988), American professional baseball player